MV Joseph and Clara Smallwood was a Marine Atlantic passenger/vehicle ferry which operated between Newfoundland and Cape Breton Island in eastern Canada. She is named after former Newfoundland premier Joseph R. Smallwood and his wife Clara.

Concept and construction
Entering service in 1989, she was built by MIL Davie Incorporated in Lauzon, Quebec, and was specifically designed for the  seasonal route between North Sydney, Nova Scotia and Argentia, Newfoundland and Labrador. A roll-on, roll-off design with a bow visor, Joseph and Clara Smallwood had 2 vehicle decks and 5 decks above, the main passenger deck being Deck 5. Her capacity included 1,200 passengers and 350 automobiles or 77 tractor trailers. She had up to 106 crewmembers.

Caribou was designed and commissioned by CN Marine in the early 1980s and was the culmination of years of research into effective icebreaking ship designs. The resulting hull design which Caribou and Joseph and Clara Smallwood were built to is called "Gulfspan", named in part after the Gulf of St. Lawrence. The "Gulfspan" hull is unique among Canadian ice-reinforced ships in that the ship slices through sea ice, rather than using its weight to ride up onto and crush the ice underneath. This design permits the sister ships to maintain close to regular operating speed.

Service history

After Joseph and Clara Smallwood replaced  in 1989, the North Sydney-Argentia crossing was reduced from 18 hours to a 14-hour schedule.

Sale
On August 11, 2011, it was announced that Joseph and Clara Smallwood had been sold to Merrion Navigation S.A. of the Marshall Islands. Her name was shortened to Smallwood and she sailed to Alang, India and was scrapped along with her elder sister Caribou.

References

Ferries of Nova Scotia
Ferries of Newfoundland and Labrador
Marine Atlantic
1989 ships
Ships built in Quebec